Mikhail Nikolayevich Kuznetsov (born 14 May 1985) is a Russian slalom canoeist who has competed since the early 2000s in the C2 class together with his partner Dmitry Larionov.

He won a bronze medal in the C2 event at the 2008 Summer Olympics in Beijing. He also finished 14th in 2012 and 6th in 2016 in the same event.

He won a bronze medal in the C2 team event at the 2015 European Championships.

References

External links
 
 
 

1985 births
Canoeists at the 2008 Summer Olympics
Canoeists at the 2012 Summer Olympics
Canoeists at the 2016 Summer Olympics
Russian male canoeists
Olympic canoeists of Russia
Olympic bronze medalists for Russia
Living people
Olympic medalists in canoeing
Medalists at the 2008 Summer Olympics
People from Nizhny Tagil
Sportspeople from Sverdlovsk Oblast